The former Hospital de la Santa Creu i Sant Pau in the neighborhood of El Guinardó, Barcelona, Catalonia, Spain, is a complex built between 1901 and 1930. It is one of the most prominent works of the Catalan modernisme architect Lluís Domènech i Montaner. The complex was listed as a Conjunto Histórico in 1978. Together with Palau de la Música Catalana, it is declared a UNESCO World Heritage Site in 1998.

Being composed of 12 pavilions connected through long underground galleries within its large green space, Sant Pau is the largest complex built in Art Nouveau style. It was a fully functioning hospital until June 2009, when the new hospital opened next to it, before undergoing restoration for use as a museum and cultural center, which opened in 2014. Besides being an important historical and architectural masterpiece, the building also offers workspaces for high-profile social organizations such as WHO, Banco Farmacéutico, Barcelona Health Hub, EMEA, UN-HABITAT and more. The cultural center also has an historical archive in which the records and documents of remarkable occurrences related to the hospital and the city can be found. The archives are open for visiting and offers information to users and researchers with the information and reprographics service, in addition to a reading room.

History

Although the hospital's current 26 buildings date from the 20th century, the Hospital de la Santa Creu (the last part of its name, "Sant Pau", was added in honour of the banker, Pau Gil, who paid for the new buildings in the twentieth century) was founded in 1401 when six small medieval hospitals merged.  The hospital's former buildings near the center of Barcelona date from the 15th century, and now house an art school (Escola Massana) and Biblioteca de Catalunya (National Library of Catalonia).

The initial building's construction that started in 1401, was completed in 1450. Later on in the 17th century, Casa Convalescència building was added to the complex. With the expansion of the city and weariness of the medieval buildings, the construction of a new hospital designed by Lluís Domènech i Montaner has begun in 1902. Domènech's original plan han 48 buildings, 27 of which were actually constructed.  
 
In 1991, the hospital was awarded St. George's Cross by the Generalitat de Catalunya.

In 2003, a new hospital building was erected to the north of the Domènech i Montaner's Modernista pavilions were almost all departments moved out. However, few departments such as the Blood and Tissue Bank, the radiography department and the physical therapist department remain in some of the old buildings.

Restoration of Sant Pau 
After ages of use in health service, the buildings of Sant Pau hospital were damaged and worn out. Therefore, a meticulous restoration of the complex began in 2009. A Heritage Committee was brought together to coordinate the process and ensure the quality of interventions. Over 30 teams of experts and architects took part in the restoration. The original configuration of the buildings was brought forth through examining historical archives before prior to the interventions.

A built are of 29.517 sqm and an outdoor space of 31.052 sqm were included in the restoration. Funded by European Regional Development Fund, Generalitat de Catalunya, the Spanish Government, IDAE, Barcelona City Council, Barcelona Provincial Council, CEB and The Private Foundation Hospital de la Sant Creu i Sant Pau the project had a total budget of 100 million €.

The restoration project had three main objectives. The first was to restore the building to its original state by strengthening the structure and removing any elements that had been added in later stages of its lifetime. The second objective was to heighten the ornamental elements with the use of materials that are suitable with the original design of the buildings. Lastly, to adapt the complex for contemporary needs and possible alternative uses without relinquishing its authenticity.

The objectives in relation to the extruction of the buildings were carried thorough in three steps. First, they recovered of the original structure and the plan by eliminating the structures that were not in the original plan. Afterward, they strengthened the infrastructure and support structure such as iron beams, framings, etc. New underground rooms and a new perimeter column was built to make a contribution tı the functionality of the building without disrupting its façade.

Even though the premises have been opened to visitors in 2014, the restoration project was expected to be fully completed in 2020.

See also
 List of Modernista buildings in Barcelona
 Art Nouveau

References

External links

Official website of the present hospital 
Hospital de Sant Pau on Gaudí i el Modernisme a Catalunya site. 
Official website of the hospital museum 

Hospitals in Barcelona
El Raval
Hospital buildings completed in 1930
Defunct hospitals in Spain
Buildings and structures in Barcelona
Modernisme architecture in Barcelona
Modernism
Culture in Barcelona
World Heritage Sites in Catalonia
Lluís Domènech i Montaner buildings
1401 establishments in Europe
Hospitals established in the 15th century
Azulejos in buildings in Catalonia
Tourist attractions in Barcelona
Art Nouveau hospital buildings
15th-century establishments in Aragon
Bien de Interés Cultural landmarks in Catalonia